

List of Rulers of the Berba state of Gwande in Benin

Sources
 http://www.rulers.org/benitrad.html

See also
Benin
Berba states
Lists of office-holders

Benin history-related lists
Government of Benin